Živim po svome (I live my way) is the 21st album from Croatian singer Josipa Lisac, released by Croatia Records in 2009.

The album is dedicated to Karlo Metikoš.

Track List

 "1000 razloga" - 4:54 (Meri Trošelj, Elvis Stanić)
 "Živim po svome" - 5:14 (Alka Vuica, Jani Hace)
 "Naivni" - 5:49 (Srđan Sekulović-Skansi)
 "Zvira voda" - 6:12 (trad.; arr. Stanić)
 "Svijet oko nas" - 4:25 (Vuica, Stanić)
 "Još se zvijezde sjaje" - 4:12 (Meri Cetinić)
 "Istina" - 4:25 (Vuica, Gojko Tomljanović)
 Bonus track: "Helena lijepa i ja u kiši (live)" - 6:15 (Romana Brolih, Drago Mlinarec)

References

2009 albums
Josipa Lisac albums
Croatia Records albums